Adunații-Copăceni is a commune located in Giurgiu County, Muntenia, Romania. It is composed of four villages: Adunații-Copăceni, Dărăști-Vlașca, Mogoșești and Varlaam.

References

Communes in Giurgiu County
Localities in Muntenia